Grand Princess Joguk (1308 – 26 November 1325) was a Mongolian imperial family member who became a Korean queen consort as the second wife of King Chungsuk of Goryeo. Her personal name was Borjigin Jintong.

Biography

Early life
The future Princess Joguk was born in 1308 in the Yuan dynasty as the daughter of Amuga and the granddaughter of Darmabala, also the sister of Bayankhutag.

Marriage
In 1325, she married King Chungsuk who was 14 years older than her in Beijing and when they arrived in Goryeo, they go to Yongsan, Hanyang where she gave birth to their son, Heir Successor Yongsan. Not long after that, the Princess died in the Goryeo Royal Palace in Yongsan at the young age (about 16,7). Then, the Yuans sent Tal Pil-al (탈필알, 脫必歹) to take care about her ancestral rites.

Later life
In the following year, in 1343, the reign Yuan Emperor Toghon Temür gave her the Yuan Imperial Title Grand Princess Joguk (조국장공주, 曹國長公主) for her Posthumous name. The future King Gongmin's primary wife, Princess Noguk was Joguk's niece.

See also
Goryeo under Mongol rule

References

External links

Princess Joguk on Encykorea .

1308 births
1325 deaths
Mongol consorts of the Goryeo Dynasty
Korean queens consort
14th-century Mongolian women
14th-century Korean women
14th-century Chinese women
14th-century Chinese people
Chinese princesses